Dodo is an unincorporated community in Clark County, in the U.S. state of Ohio.

History
A gristmill was started in 1814 on Honey Creek at the site of what is now Dodo. A post office called Dodo was established in 1884, and remained in operation until 1901.

References

Unincorporated communities in Clark County, Ohio
1814 establishments in Ohio
Populated places established in 1814
Unincorporated communities in Ohio